Moments is the second studio album by Moldovan trance producer and DJ Andrew Rayel, released on 5 May 2017 through Armada Music. It is the follow-up to Rayel's debut album Find Your Harmony, which was released on 2014. The album was announced on 18 February 2017 together with a world tour which lasted from April to August 2017. 12 out of 18 songs in the album were released as singles over a two-year period from 2016 to 2017, with the lead single being “I’ll Be There” featuring American vocalist Eric Lumiere. Moments incorporates a mixture of big room-influenced trance, progressive house, psy-trance, and dubstep within its tracks.

Background
After releasing his debut album titled Find Your Harmony on 2014, Andrew Rayel embarked on a three-year tour period where after his first year touring he began to be inspired by watching his fans. According to Rayel, the album single "Once in a Lifetime Love" was inspired during a tour show where one of the crowd members came on stage with Rayel's approval to propose to his girlfriend, whose proposal she accepted emotionally. Initially the title of the album was undecided and constantly changed. Rayel was close to naming it Big Time, as he wanted to reference the climax that the present was supposed to be the big time for everyone. After further consideration, he settled on the name Moments as he decided that it would fit the message better of remembering the special moments in one's life, which would be what the album aims to accomplish.

Based on Rayel, the main difference that separates his first album with Moments is that each track on the latter is special and specifically delivers the message of the album. "The first album I was doing without knowing what the f*** I am doing. I didn't think that much about it. I just made some tracks and played around with it. After that I got more experience and this album is really more well thought out," says Rayel. When asked about including a psy-trance track in his album which was a popular genre in 2016, Rayel denied that he was following the trends for profit and said, “Back then I played one of the first versions of "Tacadum" without the vocals. I really fell in love with that specific sound. In 2015 at EDC Las Vegas I closed my set with a psytrance track and saw the reaction of the people and it really inspired me." Rayel also added that it wasn't as interesting to produce a fully trance album as he did in Find Your Harmony, which was why he decided to experiment with multiple genres in Moments to challenge himself.

Critical reception
Moments received positive reception from critics upon release. Kat Bein from Billboard called the album a "bold, bright future for the genre [trance]" and praised the singles in Moments for maintaining a duality of hard and soft sounds.

Track listing
Writing credits adapted from AllMusic

Personnel
Credits adapted from AllMusic.

 Andrei Rata – composition, production
 Angelica Vasilcov – composition, vocals
 Kristina Antuna – composition
 André Tanneberger – composition, production
 Peter Holub – composition
 Chris Garcia – composition
 Joost Griffioen – composition
 Anthony Hewitt – composition
 Emma Hewitt – composition, vocals
 Geert Huinink – production
 Iain James – composition
 Mike James – composition, vocals
 Roberto Alzate Pasos – composition, production
 Joe Lawrence – composition
 Eric Lumiere – composition, vocals
 Jonathan Mendelsohn – composition, vocals
 Jochen Van Der Steijn – composition, production
 Christina Novelli – composition, vocals
 Kye Sones – composition, vocals
 Hansen Tomas – composition, vocals
 Sylvia Tosun – composition, vocals
 Max Vangeli – composition, production

Release history

References

External links
 Official website

2017 albums
Andrew Rayel albums
Armada Music albums